The 2002 Louisiana Tech Bulldogs football team represented Louisiana Tech University as a member of the Western Athletic Conference (WAC) during the 2002 NCAA Division I-A football season. Led by fourth-year head coach Jack Bicknell Jr., the Bulldogs played their home games at Joe Aillet Stadium in Ruston, Louisiana and Independence Stadium in Shreveport, Louisiana. Louisiana Tech finished the season with a record of 4–8 overall and a mark of 3–5 in conference play, tying for sixth place in the WAC.

Schedule

Roster

References

Louisiana Tech
Louisiana Tech Bulldogs football seasons
Louisiana Tech Bulldogs football